Country Squire Lakes is an unincorporated community and census-designated place (CDP) in Geneva Township, Jennings County, Indiana, United States. As of the 2010 census it had a population of 3,571.

It was founded in 1973 by a property developer as a planned community built around several artificial lakes.

Geography
The community is in northwestern Jennings County, it is in the southeast corner of Geneva Township. It is built around Country Squire Lake, a reservoir on Six mile Creek, as well as several smaller lakes. The lakes in the western part of the community drain to Mutton Creek. Six mile and Mutton Creeks are southwest-flowing tributaries of the Vernon Fork of the Muscatatuck River and part of the White River watershed.

Indiana State Road 7 runs along the northeast edge of the community, leading southeast  to North Vernon and northwest  to Columbus. The older community of Queensville borders Country Squire Lakes to the northeast across Highway 7.

Demographics

References

Census-designated places in Jennings County, Indiana